Roxy Shih is a Taiwanese American director and producer. She is best known for her work on the films The Tribe and Painkillers.

Career
Roxy directed the short film Play Time as a Visual Communications "Armed with a Camera" fellowship film, which premiered at the Directors Guild of America. In 2016, her directorial debut film The Tribe, starring Jessica Rothe, Anne Winters and Michael Nardelli. The film won the Best Debut Feature Film at the Female Eye Film Festival and Best Feature Director at Other Worlds Austin Film Festival.

Roxy's second feature film Painkillers, starting Madeline Zima, Grant Bowler, Debra Wilson and Adam Huss, premiered at the Brussels International Fantastic Film Festival. She is also the founder and festival director of the Taiwanese American Film Festival. She also directed the recent sci-fi anthology series Dark/Web, premiered at Comic-Con.

Filmography 

As Producer
 
 2010 - The Warp Zone
 2011 - Drone
 2011 - Play Time
 2011 - Table for Two
 2013 - Deadly Revisions 
 2013 - Novel
 2013 - Woodland Heights
 2013 - Another New Wrinkle
 2014 - Sew Clevver
 2014 - Lilies
 2014 - Seahorses
 2014 - Private Tutor
 2014 - Embers
 2014 - Ambrosia
 2015 - Close Up
 2015 - Pipe Dream

 2015 - 11:11
 2015 - The Sound of Magic
 2016 - The Tribe
 2016 - Silent Night
 2016 - The Bridge
 2016 - Im/perfect
 2017 - Your Own Road
 2017 - Get Jacked
 2017 - Mad Genius
 2017 - Peggie
 2017 - Garden Party Massacre
 2017 - Willie and Me
 2017 - The Plural of Blood
 2018 - Evoke
 2019 - End of Summer

References

External links
 
 

Year of birth missing (living people)
Living people
American film directors
American film directors of Taiwanese descent